The Massachusetts Medal of Liberty is awarded to Massachusetts service men and women who have been killed in action or who died as a result of wounds received in action.  It is bequeathed on behalf of the Governor of the Commonwealth of Massachusetts as Commander-in-Chief of the Commonwealth. The medal was designed by Sgt. Kristopher W. Adams.

Description
The medal is heart-shaped to symbolize the Purple Heart and is attached to a 1 3/8 inch wide ribbon with a black border representing mourning.

The centre of the medal bears a Gold Star symbolizing Gold Star Mothers Club.

At the top centre of the medal is the coat of arms of the Commonwealth of Massachusetts and on the rear side is the service member's branch of service with a blank space to have the honored service member's name engraved by recipient and the words “In Honored Memory” engraved above and “Service and Sacrifice” below.

References 
Massachusetts General Laws Chapter 33, Section 67A

External links 
 https://web.archive.org/web/20111006152621/http://states.ng.mil/sites/MA/PDF/MOL_Application.pdf
 http://www.mass.gov/veterans/cemeteries-and-honors/medals/massachusetts-medal-of-liberty.html

Military awards and decorations of the United States
Medal of Liberty